Peyre en Aubrac is a commune in the department of Lozère, southern France. The municipality was established on 1 January 2017 by merger of the former communes of Aumont-Aubrac (the seat), La Chaze-de-Peyre, Fau-de-Peyre, Javols, Sainte-Colombe-de-Peyre and Saint-Sauveur-de-Peyre.

Population

See also 
Communes of the Lozère department

References 

Communes of Lozère
Gabali